The Zee Cine Critics' Choice Award for Best Actor is chosen by a jury organized by Zee Entertainment Enterprises.

Multiple Winners
2 Wins : Hrithik Roshan, Ranbir Kapoor, Ranveer Singh, Amitabh Bachchan

Winners

See also 
 Zee Cine Awards
 Bollywood
 Cinema of India

External links
Winners of the 2007 Zee Cine Awards

Zee Cine Awards